Papakouli "Pape" Diop (born 19 March 1986) is a Senegalese professional footballer who plays as a defensive midfielder for Spanish club UD Ibiza.

After starting out at Rennes in France, he went on to spend most of his career in Spain. Over 12 seasons, he amassed La Liga totals of 320 matches and 12 goals, with Racing de Santander, Levante, Espanyol and Eibar.

Diop represented Senegal in two Africa Cup of Nations tournaments.

Club career

France
Born in Kaolack, Diop moved to France at early age and played youth football for Stade Rennais FC, making his first-team – and Ligue 1 – debut on 5 August 2006, as an injury-time substitute in a 1–2 home loss against Lille OSC. In the summer of 2006 he joined Tours FC, being relegated from Ligue 2 in his first season; in his beginnings, he was often deployed as an attacking midfielder and a second striker.

Spain
On 31 January 2008, Diop signed with Gimnàstic de Tarragona of the Spanish Segunda División. After one and a half seasons with the Catalans he moved to La Liga with Racing de Santander, for €1.5 million.

Diop played his first game in the Spanish top division on 12 September 2009, starting in a 1–1 away draw with Atlético Madrid. His first league goal came on 21 March of the following year, when he closed the 3–1 win at CA Osasuna.

In the 2011–12 campaign, Diop played all but four matches for the Cantabrians and totalled 2,864 minutes of action, but his team was relegated nonetheless after finishing 20th. Shortly after, he joined Levante UD of the same league for a €100,000 fee.

Diop contributed nine appearances in the 2012–13 edition of the UEFA Europa League, in a round-of-16 exit. On 22 November 2012, he scored in the 3–1 away victory over Helsingborgs IF in the group phase.

On 4 May 2014, Diop appeared to be subjected to monkey chants from a section of Atlético Madrid fans, and provided a unique response by dancing in front of his abusers. On 5 June of the following year, he left the Granotes after his contract expired.

On 31 August 2015, Diop signed a three-year deal with RCD Espanyol also in the top tier. On 22 December 2017, after cutting ties with the club, he agreed to an 18-month contract at fellow league side SD Eibar.

On 20 August 2021, free agent Diop joined second division newcomers UD Ibiza on a one-year contract.

International career
Diop won his first cap for Senegal on 17 November 2010, in a 2–1 friendly win over Gabon. He was part of the squads at the 2015 and 2017 Africa Cup of Nations, helping the nation reach the quarter-finals in the latter edition where he scored in the 2–2 group-stage draw with Algeria.

Career statistics

Club

International goals
 (Senegal score listed first, score column indicates score after each Diop goal)

References

External links
Rennes official profile 

1986 births
Living people
People from Kaolack
Senegalese footballers
Association football midfielders
Ligue 1 players
Ligue 2 players
Championnat National players
Stade Rennais F.C. players
Tours FC players
La Liga players
Segunda División players
Gimnàstic de Tarragona footballers
Racing de Santander players
Levante UD footballers
RCD Espanyol footballers
SD Eibar footballers
UD Ibiza players
Senegal international footballers
2015 Africa Cup of Nations players
2017 Africa Cup of Nations players
Senegalese expatriate footballers
Expatriate footballers in France
Expatriate footballers in Spain
Senegalese expatriate sportspeople in France
Senegalese expatriate sportspeople in Spain